Life expectancy in Saint Kitts and Nevis at birth was 75.5 years in 2011.  It was 72.3 years in 2001.

Healthcare
There are separate  ministries of health for the two islands,  with parallel organizational structures.

Hospitals
Joseph N. France General Hospital - Basseterre,
Alexandria Hospital - Charlestown, Nevis, 
Pogson Hospital - Sandy Point Town, 
Mary Charles Hospital - Nichola Town

Public health
The Ministry of Health on St. Kitts is responsible for public health surveillance and disease prevention and control programs with a single Chief Medical Officer for the Federation.

HIV
385 HIV cases were reported between 1984 and 2014. There were 149 AIDS cases, and the number of AIDS deaths was 112.

References

 
Saint Kitts and Nevis
Hospitals in Saint Kitts and Nevis